Einar Hanssen (24 August 1874 – ) was a Norwegian judge.

He was born in Nesodden to Carl Julius Hanssen and Marie Elisabeth Giverholt. He graduated as cand.jur. in 1898, and was named as a Supreme Court Justice from 1922 to 1946. He was decorated as Commander of the Swedish Order of the Polar Star, and Commander of the Danish Order of the Dannebrog.

References

1874 births
Year of death missing
People from Nesodden
Supreme Court of Norway justices
Commanders of the Order of the Polar Star
Commanders of the Order of the Dannebrog